Richton Park is the penultimate station along the main branch of the Metra Electric line, in Richton Park, Illinois. The station has two tracks and one island platform, with one of the tracks ending at the station.

Richton Park was originally built by the Illinois Central Railroad in 1946, in order to be in close proximity to the south end of the "IC Electric" coach storage yard. It served as the terminus of the line until 1977, when the Illinois Regional Transportation Authority funded the construction of  station. Today, Richton Park station is a far more modern-looking structure. Parking is available on Sauk Trail between Governor's Highway and Richton Square Road, on Richton Road, Mill Drive, and along Tower Road.

References

External links

Metra stations in Illinois
Former Illinois Central Railroad stations
Railway stations in the United States opened in 1946
Railway stations in Cook County, Illinois